West Side Soul is the debut studio album by Chicago blues musician Magic Sam. Released by Delmark Records in 1968, it is often cited as one of the key modern electric blues albums. The album includes a re-recording of Magic Sam's first Cobra Records single, "All Your Love" (1957), and an updated "Sweet Home Chicago", which became a popular blues anthem.

Critical reception

In an album review for AllMusic, Stephen Thomas Erlewine gave the album five out of five stars and commented:

In 1984, West Side Soul was inducted into the Blues Hall of Fame as a classic of blues recording. Blues historian Jim O'Neal wrote in the induction statement:

Track listing
Side A
 "That's All I Need" – 3:40
 "I Need You So Bad" – 4:51
 "I Feel So Good (I Wanna Boogie)" – 4:36
 "All of Your Love" – 3:43
 "I Don't Want No Woman"  – 3:38

Side B
 "Sweet Home Chicago"  – 4:11
 "I Found a New Love" – 4:03
 "Every Night and Every Day"  – 2:19
 "Lookin' Good" [instrumental] – 3:11
 "My Love Will Never Die" – 4:04
 "Mama Talk to Your Daughter" – 2:40

Personnel
Musicians
 Magic Sam – vocals, guitar
 Mighty Joe Young – guitar
 Stockholm Slim – piano
 Earnest Johnson – bass, except tracks 1, 3, 8
 Odie Payne – drums, except tracks 1, 3, 8
 Mac Thompson – bass on tracks 1, 3, 8
 Odie Payne, III – drums on tracks 1, 3, 8

Production
Recorded – July 12 and October 25, 1967
Album production and supervision – Robert G. Koester
Recording – Stu Black, Sound Studios

References

1967 debut albums
Magic Sam albums
Albums produced by Bob Koester
Delmark Records albums